Five Ashore in Singapore AKA Singapore, Singapore and Cinq gars pour Singapour is a 1967 French/Italian international co-production film based on the 1959 novel by Jean Bruce.  Filmed on location in Singapore in 1966, it was the last film of Sean Flynn.

The film was based on a novel by Jean Bruce who created OSS 117 and the working title was OSS117 Goes to Singapore.

Plot
Capt. Art Smith and four US Marine volunteers in Singapore investigate the disappearance of other Marines on shore leave in that city and discover that a mad scientist is responsible.

Cast
Sean Flynn  ...  Captain Art Smith  
Marika Green  ...  Monika Latzko  
Terry Downes  ...  Sgt. Gruber  
 Marc Michel  ...  Captain Kevin Gray  
 Dennis Berry  ...  Lt. Dan  
 Bernard Meusnier  ...  Lt. Ángel McIlhemy  
 Peter Gayford  ...  Mr. Brown  
 Andrea Aureli  ...  Ta-Chouen   
 Jessy Greek  ...  Ten-Sin  
 Trudy Connor  ...  Tchin-Saw  
 William Brix  ...  Cpt. Kafir  
 Foun-Sen  ...  Hsi-Houa  
 Ismail Boss  ...  Gang Member

References

External links
Five Ashore in Singapore at New York Times

1967 films
French spy thriller films
Films based on French novels
1967 adventure films
Films set in Singapore
Films shot in Singapore
Films about the United States Marine Corps
English-language French films
1960s English-language films
1960s French films